Breezing is an album by American saxophonist Sonny Red recorded in late 1960 and released in 1961 on the Jazzland label.

Track listing
All compositions by Sonny Red except as indicated
 "Brother B" - 5:02
 "All I Do Is Dream of You" (Arthur Freed, Nacio Herb Brown) - 4:03 
 "The New Blues" - 5:34
 "Ditty" - 4:36
 "'Teef" - 6:26
 "Breezing" - 6:06
 "A Handful of Stars" (Ted Shapiro, Jack Lawrence) - 4:42    
 "If There Is Someone Lovelier Than You" (Howard Dietz, Arthur Schwartz) - 2:50

Personnel
Sonny Red - alto saxophone
Blue Mitchell - trumpet (tracks 1, 3, 5 & 6)
Yusef Lateef - tenor saxophone (tracks 1, 3, 5 & 6)
Barry Harris - piano
Bob Cranshaw - bass
Albert Heath - drums

References

Jazzland Records (1960) albums
Sonny Red albums
1961 albums